The 1981 Avon Championships of Boston  was a women's tennis tournament played on indoor carpet courts at the Boston University Walter Brown Arena  in Boston, Massachusetts in the United States that was part of the 1981 Avon Championships circuit. It was the eighth edition of the tournament and was held from March 16 through March 22, 1981. First-seeded Chris Evert-Lloyd won the singles title and earned $30,000 first-prize money.

Finals

Singles
 Chris Evert-Lloyd defeated  Mima Jaušovec 6–4, 6–4
 It was Evert-Lloyd's 1st singles title of the year and the 102nd of her career.

Doubles
 Barbara Potter /  Sharon Walsh defeated  JoAnne Russell /  Virginia Ruzici 5–7, 6–4, 6–3

Prize money

References

External links
 ITF tournament edition details

Avon Championships of Boston
Virginia Slims of Boston
Avon Championships
Avon